Sydney Starkie (4 April 1926 – 18 September 2017) was an English professional cricketer who spent a six-season career at Northamptonshire.

Starkie was born at Burnley, Lancashire and died at Amersham, Buckinghamshire.

Starkie was an off-break bowler, and he played in 95 first-class games from 1951 to 1956. He is also remembered for one batting feat: in 1955 Starkie and Raman Subba Row set a Northamptonshire club record of 156 for the highest ninth-wicket partnership. Starkie was awarded his county cap in 1954.

Death 
Starkie died on 18 September 2017 at the age of 91 at Amersham, Buckinghamshire.

References

1926 births
2017 deaths
English cricketers
Northamptonshire cricketers
Cricketers from Burnley